Robert Gifford is professor of Psychology and Environmental Studies at the University of Victoria (British Columbia, Canada). His main research interests are environmental psychology, social psychology and personality psychology. He has worked on nonverbal behavior and on climate change behavior barriers. Gifford is the author of five editions of Environmental Psychology: Principles and Practice, which has also been translated into Japanese, and edited Research Methods for Environmental Psychology (2016). From 2004 to 2016, he was the editor in chief of the Journal of Environmental Psychology. Gifford is also on the editorial boards of Architectural Science Review and Applied Psychology. He has been president of the environmental divisions of the American Psychological Association, the International Association of Applied Psychology and the Canadian Psychological Association.

Books

Awards 
 1991 Fellow of the Canadian Psychological Association
 1992 Fellow of the American Psychological Association
 2007 Fellow of the Association for Psychological Science 
 2007 Career Award from the Environmental Design Research Association
 2016 Newman-Proshansky Career Achievement Award (Division 34, American Psychological Association) 
 2016 Award for Distinguished Contributions to the International Advancement of Psychology (Canadian Psychological Association) 
 2019 Fellow of the Royal Society of Canada

References

External links 
 

Canadian psychologists
Environmental psychologists
Living people
Year of birth missing (living people)
Environmental studies scholars
Fellows of the American Psychological Association
University of California, Davis alumni